Aedh mac Cathal Crobdearg Ua Conchobair (reigned 1224–1228) was King of Connacht with opposition alongside his uncle Toirdhealbhach mac Ruaidhrí Ó Conchobhair. Aedh succeeded his father Cathal Crobhdearg upon his death in 1224 but struggled to assert control over the entire province. His reign closely mirrored the early years of his fathers with two rival claimants, backed by outside powers, fighting an indecisive civil war lasting several years.

Life and Reign

When his father Cathal died in 1224 Aedh initially succeeded him smoothly because as the Annals of Connacht note, ''he had been king in effect by the side of his father and already held all the hostages of Connacht. And God granted him this kingdom, for no crime was committed in Connacht at the moment of his accession save one robbery on the road to Cruach, and the hands and feet of the robber were cut off, and the violation of one woman by O Mannachan's son, who was blinded forthwith for the offence."  His accession is celebrated in a poem 'Congaibh rom t'aghaidh, a Aodh' in which he is said to be the prophesied Aodh who will drive the English 'usurpers' from Ireland.

His first major act as king was to join an expedition against the de Lacy family by the majority of Irish and Norman lords from the south of Ireland on behalf of the King of England. This brought these lords into conflict with the de Lacy's ally Aodh O'Neill King of Ailech and ended in a stalemate due to reluctance to attack O'Neill's superior defensive position.

Perhaps as a result of this aggression, O'Neill in the following year marched an army into Connacht and installed Toirdhealbhach as king. He received the backing of  Aedh's major discontented vassals, Donn Oc MacAirechtaig the lord of Siol Muireadaigh as well as the Ó Flaithbheartaigh lords of western Connacht, whom Aedh had confiscated lands from. Only his hereditary marshal Cormac Mac Diarmata king of Moylurg remained loyal. Aedh looking for allies among the Normans of Meath proceeded  to Athlone and there promised them payment and gifts if they would back him as king, as his father had previously done years earlier. They agreed and with another ally Donnchadh Cairbreach Ó Briain King of Thomond drove both Toirdhealbhach and his O'Neill allies from Connacht.

Aedh thereafter received the submission of his rebellious vassals and guarantees to no longer support his rivals, the sons of Ruadhri. However they were merely bidding their time until Aedh's Norman allies dispersed and promptly rebelled once again in 1225 when their armies had left the kingdom. Aedh's only response was to recall his allies once more who again answered his call eagerly as they were permitted to plunder the province as payment. Toirdhealbhach and his followers were again forced to seek refuge in Ulster with the O'Neill's and in 1226 many hostages including Aedh's own son and daughter were given to the Normans as guarantee of future payment for their support. In 1227 Aedh was summoned to attend court in Dublin by the English where they were apparently plotting his capture or death. Only the intervention of his friend William Marshal, the 2nd Earl of Pembroke allowed him to escape and he would go on to burn Athlone in revenge, killing its constable and freeing the hostages he had previously handed over.

After this he proceeded to the court of the King of Tir Chonaill likely to try and win his support, but seems to have come away empty handed with his wife being captured by Toirdhealbhach's followers on the return journey and handed over to the English. The next year having been expelled from Connacht by his own subjects once again he was murdered at the court of Geoffrey de Mareys, according to the annals of Connacht by a carpenter working on behalf of the de Lacy's.

Aedh's reign was mostly a failure marred by conflicts with his vassals and the use of foreign troops to impose his authority, something which in itself was not uncommon for later kings of Connacht. His rival  Toirdhealbhach mac Ruaidhrí Ó Conchobhair was deposed in the same year as his death by his own younger brother Aedh mac Ruaidri Ó Conchobair, who was in turn killed and succeeded by Aedh's younger brother Felim O'Connor in 1233.

Offspring
Aedh has five sons and a daughter. These included;
Ruaidrí Ó Conchobair, grandfather of Aedh Ó Conchobair
Una Ní Conchobair, wife of Robert de Gernon

References

1228 deaths
Kings of Connacht
13th-century Irish monarchs
Murdered royalty
Assassinated Irish politicians
People from County Roscommon
People from County Galway
Aedh
Year of birth unknown
Gaels